Krasino may refer to:

Krasino, Bulgaria, a village in Kardzhali Province, Bulgaria
Krasino, Russia, several inhabited localities in Russia